Fabrício de Andrade (born October 10, 1997) is a Brazilian mixed martial artist and former Muay Thai kickboxer, who competes in the Bantamweight division of ONE Championship, where he is the current ONE Bantamweight World Champion.

Background 
Andrade was born in Fortaleza, where growing up was dangerous, and there weren’t many opportunities for young people in the region to leave and further themselves, but when Andrade found Muay Thai at the age of 13, he knew this could be his ticket to a better life. The Brazilian quickly developed a true passion for the sport, and soon, it transformed him both physically and mentally. Andrade trains out of Tiger Muay Thai in Phuket and has trained with the who’s who of the UFC champion the past few years, like Petr Yan and Alexander Volkanovski.

Mixed martial arts career

ONE Championship
Andrade made his debut against Mark Abelardo on July 31, 2020, at ONE: No Surrender. He won the fight via a rear-naked choke technical submission in the second round.

Andrade faced Shoko Sato on January 22, 2021 and aired on February 5, 2021, at ONE: Unbreakable 3. He won the fight via unanimous decision.

Andrade faced Li Kai Wen on December 3, 2021 and aired on December 17, 2021, at ONE: Winter Warriors II. He won the fight via technical knockout in the first round.

Andrade faced Jeremy Pacatiw on February 25, 2022, at ONE: Full Circle. He won the fight via knee to the body knockout in the first round.

Andrade faced Kwon Won Il on June 3, 2022, at ONE 158. He won the fight via a body kick knockout in the first round. This win earned him the Performance of the Night award.

Andrade faced John Lineker for the ONE Bantamweight World Championship on October 22, 2022, at ONE on Prime Video 3. At weigh-ins, John Lineker missed weight, coming in at 145.75 lbs, 0.75 pounds over the limit. Lineker was stripped of the title and the bout proceeded at a catchweight with only Andrade being able to win the title. Andrade also got 20% of his purse. During the beginning of the third round, Andrade accidentally connected with a strike to the groin of Lineker, who could not continue. The fight was declared a no contest.

A rematch between Lineker and Andrade for the vacant ONE Bantamweight World Championship took place on February 25, 2023, at ONE Fight Night 7. He won the bout and title by technical knockout after Lineker's corner stopped the fight after the fourth round.

Championships and accomplishments 
ONE Championship
ONE Bantamweight World Championship (One time)
Performance of the Night (One time)

Mixed martial arts record 

|-
|Win
|align=center|9–2 (1)
|John Lineker
|TKO (corner stoppage)
|ONE Fight Night 7
|
|align=center|4 
|align=center|5:00 
|Bangkok, Thailand
|
|-
|NC
|align=center| 8–2 (1)
|John Lineker
|No Contest (accidental groin strike)
|ONE on Prime Video 3
|
|align=center| 3
|align=center| 2:44
|Kuala Lumpur, Malaysia 
|
|-
|Win
|align=center| 8–2
|Kwon Won Il
|KO (body kick)
|ONE 158
|
|align=center| 1
|align=center| 1:02
|Kallang, Singapore 
|
|-
|Win
|align=center| 7–2
|Jeremy Pacatiw 
|KO (knee to the body)
|ONE: Full Circle
|
|align=center| 1
|align=center| 1:37
|Kallang, Singapore 
|
|-
|Win
|align=center| 6–2
|Li Kai Wen
|TKO (punches)
|ONE: Winter Warriors II
|
|align=center| 1
|align=center| 4:41
|Kallang, Singapore 
|
|-
|Win
|align=center| 5–2
|Shoko Sato 
|Decision (unanimous)
|ONE: Unbreakable 3
|
|align=center| 3
|align=center| 5:00
|Kallang, Singapore 
|
|-
|Win
|align=center| 4–2
|Mark Abelardo 
|Technical Submission (rear-naked choke)
|ONE: No Surrender
|
|align=center| 2
|align=center| 1:11
|Bangkok, Thailand
|
|-
|Win
|align=center| 3–2
|Lige Teng
|Decision (unanimous)
|WLF W.A.R.S. 33
|
|align=center| 3
|align=center| 5:00
|Zhengzhou, China
|
|-
|Win
|align=center| 2–2
|Xiatiha Zhumatai
|Submission (rear-naked choke)
|Kunlun Fight 71
|
|align=center| 2
|align=center| 3:23
|Qingdao, China
|
|-
|Loss
|align=center| 1–2
|Xiaolong Wu
|Decision
|Kunlun Fight MMA 15
|
|align=center|3
|align=center|5:00
|Alashan, China
|
|-
|Loss
|align=center| 1–1
|Zelimkhan Betergaraev
|TKO (punches)
|WFCA 17: Battle in Kazakhstan 
|
|align=center| 2
|align=center| 2:36
|Pavlodar, Kazakhstan 
|
|-
|Win
|align=center| 1–0
|Markinho Guerreiro
|TKO (punches)
|Mix Fight Brazil 2
|
|align=center| 2
|align=center| 2:36
|Fortaleza, Brazil
|

Kickboxing and Muay Thai record

|-  style="text-align:center; background:#cfc;"
| 2019-08-31||Win||align=left| Jin Ying || Wu Lin Feng 2019: WLF -67kg World Cup 2019-2020 3rd Group Stage || Zhengzhou, China || TKO (Doctor stoppage) || 3 ||

|-  style="text-align:center; background:#cfc;"
| 2019-07-27|| Win ||align=left| Hu Zheng || Wu Lin Feng 2019: WLF -67kg World Cup 2019-2020 2nd Group Stage || Zhengzhou, China || Decision (Unanimous)|| 3 || 3:00

|-  style="text-align:center; background:#cfc;"
| 2019-03-30|| Win ||align=left| Zhao Chuanlin || Wu Lin Feng 2019: WLF x Lumpinee - China vs Thailand || Zhengzhou, China || Decision (Unanimous)|| 3 || 3:00

|- align="center" bgcolor="#fbb"
| 2018-12-01 ||Loss ||align=left| Zhu Shuai || Wu Lin Feng 2019, -60 kg Contender Tournament Semi Final  || Zhengzhou, China || KO (Left Hook) || 2 || 1:50

|-  style="text-align:center; background:#cfc;"
| 2018-11-07|| Win ||align=left| Zhang Lanpei || Wu Lin Feng 2018: WLF x KF1 || Hong Kong || Decision || 3 || 3:00

|-  style="text-align:center; background:#cfc;"
| 2018-09-01|| Win ||align=left| Chen Yong || Wu Lin Feng 2018: WLF -67kg World Cup 2018-2019 3rd Round || Zhengzhou, China || Decision (Unanimous) || 3 || 3:00

|-  style="text-align:center; background:#cfc;"
| 2018-07-07|| Win ||align=left| Fang Feida || Wu Lin Feng 2018: WLF -67kg World Cup 2018-2019 1st Round || Zhengzhou, China || Decision || 3 || 3:00

|-  style="text-align:center; background:#cfc;"
| 2018-06-02|| Win ||align=left| Lu Pinbo || Wu Lin Feng 2018: Yi Long VS Saiyok || Chongqing, China || TKO (Knee to the body)|| 2||

|-  style="text-align:center; background:#cfc;"
| 2017-11-05|| Win ||align=left| Zhang Hua || Kunlun Fight 66 || Wuhan, China || KO || 2 ||

|-  style="text-align:center; background:#cfc;"
| 2017-09-02|| Win ||align=left| Peng Shuai || Kunlun Hero City || China || TKO || 1 ||

|-  style="text-align:center; background:#cfc;"
| 2017-04-08|| Win ||align=left| Eduardo Terceiro || Coronel Combate || Fortaleza, Brazil ||  || ||

|-  style="text-align:center; background:#cfc;"
| 2017-03-18|| Win ||align=left|  || NKB || Fortaleza, Brazil || KO || || 
|-
! style=background:white colspan=9 |

|-  style="text-align:center; background:#cfc;"
| 2016-12-02|| Win ||align=left| Douglas Nunes || WGP Kickboxing 35 || Fortaleza, Brazil || Decision (Unanimous) || 3 || 3:00

|-  style="text-align:center; background:#cfc;"
| 2016-09-24|| Win ||align=left|  ||  || Brazil || KO (High kick + knees) ||  ||

|-  style="text-align:center; background:#cfc;"
| 2016-07-23|| Win ||align=left| Pedro Rodrigues  || Aspera Kickboxing || Fortaleza, Brazil || TKO (Left Hook to the body) ||  ||

|-
| colspan=10 | Legend:

See also
List of current ONE fighters

References

External links
 
 Fabrício Andrade at ONE Championship

1997 births
Living people
Brazilian Muay Thai practitioners
Brazilian male mixed martial artists
Mixed martial artists utilizing Muay Thai
Mixed martial artists utilizing kickboxing
Bantamweight mixed martial artists
Featherweight mixed martial artists
Brazilian male kickboxers
People from Fortaleza
Sportspeople from Fortaleza